The 67th World Science Fiction Convention (Worldcon), also known as Anticipation, was held on 6–10 August 2009 at the Palais des congrès de Montréal in Montréal, Québec, Canada.

The organising committee was co-chaired by René Walling and Robbie Bourget.

This convention was also the 2009 Canvention, and therefore presented the Prix Aurora Awards.

This was the fifth Worldcon to be held in Canada, and the first one to be held in an officially French-speaking city.

Participants

Guests of Honour 

 Neil Gaiman
 Elisabeth Vonarburg
 Taral Wayne (fan)
 David Hartwell (editor)
 Tom Doherty (publisher)
 Julie Czerneda (toastmaster)

Awards 

A number of notable science fiction and fantasy awards were presented at Anticipation.

2009 Hugo Awards 

Anticipation was the first Worldcon to include a category for graphic story on the Hugo ballot. The category filled with six nominations due to a tie for fifth place.

The 2009 Hugo Award statue base was designed by Seattle-based artist Dave Howell.

 Best Novel: The Graveyard Book by Neil Gaiman
 Best Novella: "The Erdmann Nexus" by Nancy Kress
 Best Novelette: "Shoggoths in Bloom" by Elizabeth Bear
 Best Short Story: "Exhalation" by Ted Chiang
 Best Related Book: Your Hate Mail Will Be Graded: A Decade of Whatever, 1998–2008 by John Scalzi
 Best Dramatic Presentation, Long Form: WALL-E, story by Andrew Stanton and Pete Docter; screenplay by Andrew Stanton & Jim Reardon; directed by Andrew Stanton (Pixar/Walt Disney)
 Best Dramatic Presentation, Short Form: Doctor Horrible's Sing-Along Blog, written by Joss Whedon, Zack Whedon, Jed Whedon, and Maurissa Tancharoen, directed by Joss Whedon
 Best Professional Editor, Long Form: David G. Hartwell
 Best Professional Editor, Short Form: Ellen Datlow
 Best Professional Artist: Donato Giancola
 Best Semiprozine: Weird Tales, edited by Ann VanderMeer and Stephen H. Segal
 Best Fanzine: Electric Velocipede, edited by John Klima
 Best Fan Writer: Cheryl Morgan
 Best Fan Artist: Frank Wu
 Best Graphic Story: Girl Genius, Volume 8: "Agatha Heterodyne and the Chapel of Bones", written by Kaja and Phil Foglio, art by Phil Foglio, color by Cheyenne Wright

Prix Aurora Awards 

This Worldcon being also the 2009 Canvention, it awarded the Prix Aurora Awards. They are given out annually for the best Canadian science fiction and fantasy literary works, artworks, and fan activities from that year, and are awarded in both English and French.

 Best Long Form: Marseguro, by Edward Willett
 Meilleur livre: Les vents de Tammerlan, by Michèle Laframboise
 Best Short Form: "Ringing in the Changes in Okotoks, Alberta", by Randy McCharles
 Meilleure nouvelle: Le Dôme de Saint-Macaire, by Jean-Louis Trudel
 Other, in English: Neo-opsis Science Fiction Magazine, Karl Johanson, editor
 Meilleur ouvrage (autre): Solaris, Joël Champetier
 Fanzine: The Original Universe, Jeff Boman, editor
 Fan (organizational): Randy McCharles (Chair of World Fantasy 2008)
 Fan (other): Joan Sherman for Heather Dale Concert (organizer)
 Artistic Achievement: Looking for Group, by Lar deSouza

Sidewise Awards 

The Sidewise Award for Alternate History recognizes the best alternate history stories and novels of the year.
 Long form: Chris Roberson, The Dragon's Nine Sons
 Short form: Mary Rosenblum, "Sacrifice"

Other awards 

 John W. Campbell Award for Best New Writer: David Anthony Durham

Future site selection

Worldcon 

In uncontested elections, the members of Anticipation selected Reno, Nevada, as the host city for the 69th World Science Fiction Convention, Renovation, to be held in 2011; and Raleigh, North Carolina, as the host city for the 10th North American Science Fiction Convention (NASFiC), ReConStruction, to be held in 2010.

Canvention 

The Canadian Science Fiction and Fantasy Association selected Winnipeg, Manitoba, as the location of Canvention 2010 and the 30th Prix Aurora Awards.

See also 

 Hugo Award
 Science fiction
 Speculative fiction
 World Science Fiction Society
 Worldcon

References

External links 

 Anticipation—the 67th Worldcon
 Official Worldcon Homepage

2009 conferences
2009 in Canada
Science fiction conventions in Canada
Worldcon